Meotipa spiniventris is a species of spider of the genus Meotipa. It is found along Sri Lanka to Japan, and later introduced in to European countries, such as Netherlands.

See also
 List of Theridiidae species

References

Theridiidae
Chelicerates of Japan
Spiders of Asia
Spiders of Europe
Spiders described in 1869